The HAL Light Utility Helicopter (LUH) along with its derivative Light Observation Helicopter (LOH) was designed and developed by Rotary Wing Research and Design Center (RWR&DC) one of the R&D sections of Hindustan Aeronautics Limited (HAL) for civilian and military applications. These are intended to replace license-built versions of Aérospatiale SA 315B Lama (designated Cheetah) and Aérospatiale Alouette III (designated Chetak) in service with Indian Army and Indian Air Force.

Development

Background
During the 1990s and the 2000s, the procurement of a modern successor to the aging HAL Cheetah and HAL Chetak helicopters of the Indian Army and the Indian Air Force had been recognised as an impending need. Multiple attempts at establishing a competitive tendering programme; one such effort specified a total of 197 utility helicopters for the Indian Army, 60 of which were to be directly purchased and the remaining 137 to be produced under licence by Indian aerospace company Hindustan Aeronautics Limited (HAL). However, this tender, in which the Eurocopter Fennec appeared to be the frontrunner against the rival Bell 407, eventually ended up being cancelled in response to allegations of irregularities in the selection process; Eurocopter was subsequently investigated and exonerated of any wrongdoing. Consequently, new safeguards were implemented to ensure impartiality and the replacement effort was subsequently restarted.

During July 2008, the Government of India circulated a request for proposals (RFP) to various helicopter companies, including AgustaWestland, Bell Helicopter, Eurocopter, Kamov and Sikorsky, for a fleet of 197 light utility helicopters to be purchased in a fly-away condition directly from the manufacturer in order to speed up their delivery. Intended for military purposes, the potential contract was valued as a maximum of $750 million, of which 30 per cent was required to be invested within India under the government's policy of industrial offsets; HAL was also specified as to provide domestic maintenance activities for the fleet, who were reportedly also keen to manufacture further examples locally and further develop the selected type. It had been initially hoped that trials would begin in 2009 and that helicopter deliveries could commence as early as 2010.

By late 2008, Bell had announced its decision not to participate despite earlier considerations on offering a variant of their Bell 407 helicopter; according to Bell, the high offset requirements had made any bid less feasible and thus the company chose to withdraw from the Indian military market. Rival firm Russian Helicopters, submitting its Kamov Ka-226T, was another major competitor for the competition. Shortly after the selection of the Ka-226T to meet the requirement, during December 2015, an agreement was signed for the creation of a joint venture between Rostec, Russian Helicopters and HAL to manufacture the Ka-226T at a new factory to be built at Tumakuru, India. Meanwhile, HAL, which had long held ambitions to design and produce such an aircraft, sought to establish a partnership with a Western manufacturer with considerable technical knowhow in the field; reportedly, Eurocopter were viewed as being the favourite, having already worked with HAL for decades on previous ventures, such as the Chetak and Cheetal that were being replaced.

Project launch

During February 2009, India's defence ministry approved HAL's proposal to enter the design phase on an indigenous design that could potentially meet the requirements of the competition, as well to explore partnership arrangements. HAL promptly performed preliminary design studies on a prospective 3-tonne light helicopter, powered by a single HAL/Turbomeca Shakti turboshaft engine and possessing a range of up to 500 km (270 nm) and a payload capacity of up to 500 kg (1,100 lb). In March 2010, HAL announced that it had decided to proceed on the LUH project alone, without any international partner participating in its development.

In February 2011, HAL unveiled a full-sized mockup of its LUH design. At this point, the design of the LUH was officially frozen, but some elements, such as the powerplant, were yet to be selected for the type; additionally, the first prototype was anticipated to be constructed by the end of 2012 and the first flight was scheduled to occur during 2013. By early November 2012, the bottom structure assembly of the LUH ground test vehicle had been completed. According to HAL, the manufacturing jigs, which are of a modular and gaugeless design, consisting of five assembly jigs and a coupling jig, had been developed and validated using Computer Aided Measurement System (CAMS) to establish high accuracy and stability, which produces smooth and flawless 'First off' structure build.In March 2014, HAL promoted its LUH's capabilities as a civilian multirole helicopter, noting its ability to carry up to six passengers in an appropriate configuration.

Test programme
Following repeated delays to the type's first flight, on 6 September 2016, the first prototype LUH PT-1 (ZG4620) conduct its maiden flight outside HAL's manufacturing facility at Bangalore. The maiden flight, which was reportedly flown without any issues, marked the commencement of the flight test phase of development.

On 14 February 2017, the first prototype performed an aerobatic display in front of members of the general public in Aero India 2017. Based on the feedback from the first prototype, a more refined second prototype performed its first flight on 22 May 2017.

The LUH flew at 6 km altitude Envelope Expansion Test at Bengaluru, a critical certification requirement, in December 2018. Subsequently, on 14 December 2018, the third prototype PT-3 had its maiden flight. In 2018, the LUH finished hot weather trials at Nagpur. Testing at sea-level altitudes was completed at Chennai in 2018 and at Puducherry in 2019.In January 2019, the LUH successfully completed cold weather trials. The LUH undertook successful high altitude hot weather trials between 24 August and 2 September 2019. By 7 February 2020, three prototypes had cumulatively performed over 550 flights. On 7 February 2020, the LUH received its Initial Operational Clearance (IOC) from the Ministry of Defence's (MoD) department of Defence Research and Development.

The Indian Army has requested a final demonstration trial prior to the LUH goes into mass production. HAL announced the completion of the final demonstration trial on 9 September 2020, which involved envelope expansion, performance, flying qualities, payload and landing capabilities at the highest altitudes of Siachen Glacier. The Final Operational Clearance (FOC) is planned for 2021, following tests focused on its automatic flight control system (AFCS).

During an official visit on 7 October 2021, Director General of Army Aviation Corps Lt Gen AK Suri flew the final test sortie in Light Utility Helicopter which successfully completed the Army Acceptance Trial. HAL LUH is now ready for induction by the Indian Armed Forces. From August 2022, HAL will start flight trial of limited series production (LSP) platform.

Manufacturing 

While limited series production (LSP) will be completed from Bengaluru, HAL intends to perform mass production of the LUH at its new helicopter manufacturing complex at Tumakur that will have the capacity to produce helicopters of 3 ton to 12 ton category. The Tumakur assembly line will complete around 30 LUHs per year by 2019–2020; upon enacting Phase II, which will take another three-four years, production would be ramped up to 60 helicopters per year from 2023.

Tumakur assembly line will become fully operational from March 2022. As per government report from Rajya Sabha, Army and IAF will get two LSP each from 2022-23. After that HAL will start rolling out series production (SP) variants. The gearbox was developed by Microtec company located in Hyderabad, while the ring gear is built by Shanti Gears and transmission by HAL. Avionics hardware is supplied by Chennai based Data patterns and HAL worked on the software. With supplies from many other Indian companies, HAL plans to take the indigenous content to over 60 percent.

Ministry of Defence placed an initial order of 12 Light Utility Helicopters out of which 6 are for Indian Army and another 6 for the Indian Air Force. First LUH will be delivered by August 2022. Defence Acquisition Council (DAC) on 2 November 2021 approved purchase of 12 Limited Series Production (LSP) variant of LUH. HAL on 20 October 2022, awarded the contract for design and development of night vision goggles for LUH to MKU. It will be powered by Generation 3 (GEN III) technology. The development will be handled by Netro Optronics division at MKU.

Indian Coast Guard Director General V S Pathania lead a delegation of officials to Helicopter Division of HAL, during which he undertook a 45 minute sortie in LUH. ICG is evaluating replacement of Chetak helicopters in fleet with the LUH.

Design

The HAL Light Utility Helicopter (LUH) is a 3-tonne class highly agile new generation light helicopter. According to HAL, it possesses a cruise speed of 235 km/h, maximum speed of 260 km/h, service ceiling of up to 6.5 km, a range of 350 km with maximum take-off weight of 3.12 tonne and an empty weight of 1.91 tonne. The LUH will be capable of accommodating a maximum of two pilots and six passengers, all of which shall be seated on crash-worthy seats; externally, it is capable of carrying cargoes of up to 1 tonne under-slung. LUH with glass cockpit will be able to undertake various missions, including emergency medical services (EMS), troop transport, utility, search and rescue (S&R), VVIP, aerial reconnaissance and surveillance missions.

LUH is powered by a single 750 KW rated Shakti-1U turboshaft engine derived from Safran Ardiden, co-developed by HAL and Turbomeca. It supports dual channel Full Authority Digital Engine Control (FADEC) system along with backup fuel control system. The helicopter will be equipped with a glass cockpit featuring a Smart Cockpit Display System (SCDS) along with a skid-based landing gear arrangement. LUH is the only helicopter in the 3 ton class to have foldable rotors.

Operator

Military operators

 

 Indian Air Force: 6 on order, 61 planned.
 Indian Army: 6 on order, 126 planned. 
 Indian Coast Guard : Working to replace Chetak fleet with LUH.

Civil operators

 Vman Aviation : 5 planned

Specifications

See also

References

External links

 HAL LUH official site

Light Utility Helicopter
Military helicopters
Indian helicopters
Aircraft first flown in 2016